Traisental is an Austrian wine region. To the south of Krems lies Herzogenburg, at the centre of Traisen Valley, which was designated as a wine district in 1995. Mostly Grüner Veltliner is grown in this region, which is made into a fresh style for drinking young.

References

Wine regions of Austria